Vulture Peak is located in the Livingston Range, Glacier National Park in the U.S. state of Montana. The Vulture Glacier is located on the southern flanks of the mountain, while the Two Ocean Glacier is immediately to the north. Vulture Peak is the thirteenth highest summit in Glacier National Park.

See also
 List of mountains and mountain ranges of Glacier National Park (U.S.)

References

Livingston Range
Mountains of Flathead County, Montana
Mountains of Glacier National Park (U.S.)
Mountains of Montana